George James Jr. (January 20, 1927 – September 14, 2008) was an American football coach.  He served as the head football coach at Alabama State University from 1976 to 1983 and Kentucky State University from 1990 to 1991, compiling a career college football coaching record of 45–57–3.  James died at the age of 81, on September 14, 2008, at his home in Montgomery, Alabama.

Head coaching record

College

References

1927 births
2008 deaths
Alabama State Hornets football coaches
Kentucky State Thorobreds football coaches
North Carolina A&T Aggies football coaches
High school football coaches in Alabama
African-American coaches of American football
20th-century African-American sportspeople
21st-century African-American sportspeople